The Nelson-class ships of the line were a class of three 120-gun first rates, designed for the Royal Navy as a joint effort between the two Surveyors of the Navy at the time, Robert Seppings and Joseph Tucker.

Ships

Builder: Woolwich Dockyard
Ordered: 23 November 1805
Laid down: December 1809
Launched: 4 July 1814
Completed: 17 August 1814
Fate: Broken up, 1928

Builder: Plymouth Dockyard
Ordered: 15 January 1806
Laid down: May 1810
Launched: 11 March 1815
Completed 1829
Fate: Sold, 1906

Builder: Chatham Dockyard
Ordered: 15 January 1806
Laid down: June 1808
Launched: 28 March 1815
Completed: 1835
Fate: Sold, 1854

References

Lavery, Brian (2003) The Ship of the Line - Volume 1: The development of the battlefleet 1650-1850. Conway Maritime Press. .
Lyon, David and Winfield, Rif (2004) The Sail and Steam Navy List, 1815-1889. Chatham Publishing. .
Winfield, Rif (2008) British Warships in the Age of Sail, 1793-1817: Design, Construction, Careers and Fates. 2nd edition, Seaforth Publishing. .

 
Ship of the line classes